Selma  is a former municipality in Moesa District in the Swiss canton of Graubünden. On 1 January 2015 the former municipalities of Arvigo, Braggio, Cauco and Selma merged to form the new municipality of Calanca.

The local language is Italian.

With a population at the end of 2008 of only 36, it was one of the smallest communities in Switzerland. The village had however declared its intention to remain an independent entity.

Geography
Of this area, 5.6% is used for agricultural purposes, while 68.8% is forested. Of the rest of the land, 3.5% is settled (buildings or roads) and the remainder (22.2%) is non-productive (rivers, glaciers or mountains).

The former municipality is located in the Calanca sub-district of the Moesa district.

Demographics
Selma had a population (as of 2013) of 33.  , 8.3% of the population was made up of foreign nationals.  Over the last 10 years the population has decreased at a rate of -4.9%.  Most of the population speaks Italian (65.9%), with the rest (34.1%) speaking German.

, the gender distribution of the population was 48.7% male and 51.3% female. The age distribution, in Selma is; 8 children or 18.2% of the population are between 0 and 9 years old. 2 teenagers or 4.5% are 10 to 14, and no one is between 15 and 19. Of the adult population, 2 people or 4.5% of the population are between 20 and 29 years old. 9 people or 20.5% are 30 to 39, 5 people or 11.4% are 40 to 49, and 7 people or 15.9% are 50 to 59. The senior population distribution is 5 people or 11.4% of the population are between 60 and 69 years old, 5 people or 11.4% are 70 to 79, there is 1 person who is 80 to 89.

In the 2007 Swiss federal election the CVP received 53.8% of the vote.  Most of the rest of the votes went to the SP with 36.3% of the vote.

In Selma about 84% of the population (between age 25–64) have completed either non-mandatory upper secondary education or additional higher education (either university or a Fachhochschule).

Selma has an unemployment rate of 3.41%. , there were 2 people employed in the primary economic sector and about 1 business involved in this sector.  people are employed in the secondary sector and there are  businesses in this sector. 5 people are employed in the tertiary sector, with 2 businesses in this sector.

The historical population is given in the following table:

References

External links
 Official website 

Calanca
Former municipalities of Graubünden